The Herald is a Reach plc newspaper serving Plymouth. Its website and social media were rebranded as Plymouth Live in 2018.

Print and online presence 
The newspaper's average circulation was 6,430 in the first six months of 2022, made up of 5,072 paid-for single issues and 1,358 paid subscriptions.

The Herald is published six days a week, Monday to Saturday, and has a single edition. It is owned by Reach plc, formerly known as Trinity Mirror.

Its sister titles include the Express & Echo in Exeter, the Herald Express in Torquay and the Western Morning News.

Over 80% of the local adult population in the Plymouth region were said to use The Herald's website in 2013.

In 2018, The Herald's website was rebranded as Plymouth Live by Reach plc.

Its sister websites are Devon Live and Cornwall Live.

Plymouth Live is active on social media, regularly posting breaking news, pictures and videos on its Facebook, Twitter. and Instagram pages

It has more than 196,000 followers on Facebook, almost 70,000 followers on Twitter, and around 24,800 followers on Instagram.

The Herald's print team is run by editor Claire Ainsworth.

Edd Moore is the editor of Plymouth Live. He took over the role in 2018 aged 33 from former editor Paul Burton.

Edd joined the paper as a trainee reporter in 2008. He held several roles before becoming editor, including chief reporter, deputy news editor and head of content.

Plymouth Live's head of content is Sarah Waddington.

History 
The history of the Herald stretches back to 2 pm on Monday 22 April 1895 when the Western Evening Herald was launched as Plymouth's first evening newspaper. Various other newspapers had come and gone in Plymouth in the preceding 100 years. The WEH was published by the owners of the Western Daily Mercury. It was then bought by Sir Leicester Harmsworth in 1921 — a year after he bought the Western Morning News company — and was renamed The Evening Herald and Western Evening News on 17 September 1923. On 24 May 1924, the name was changed again to the Western Evening Herald and Western Evening News.

After changing format to tabloid in 1987, the title changed again to the Evening Herald, becoming simply The Herald in October 2006 when its print deadline shifted from midmorning (between 9 am and 11 am) to 1 am to accommodate the 120-mile distribution journey to Plymouth after printing was transferred to Weymouth in Dorset.

Alan Clark, the Conservative MP for Plymouth Sutton from 1974 to 1992, dismissed the people of Plymouth as "believing everything they read in the Herald".

In 2012, Local World acquired owner Northcliffe Media from Daily Mail and General Trust.

References

External links
Official website
Plymouth Argyle section
Archive of stories related to The Herald at Hold the Front Page

Northcliffe Media
Newspapers published in Devon
Mass media in Plymouth, Devon
Newspapers published in Cornwall
Publications established in 1895
1895 establishments in England
Daily newspapers published in the United Kingdom